Alois Grussmann (born 6 September 1964) is a Czech football manager and former player, who played as a forward. He played in the Czechoslovak First League with Baník Ostrava and Vítkovice between 1984 and 1991, before spending a season in Spain with Real Betis. Following his return to his homeland, Grussmann played mainly for Opava, where he played five seasons in the Czech First League. Grussmann represented Czechoslovakia internationally, winning six caps and scoring one goal between 1988 and 1991.

Club career
Grussmann started to play his club football in Czechoslovakia for Baník Ostrava. In 1986, he joined Vítkovice, with whom he stayed for five seasons, playing 148 Czechoslovak First League matches and scoring 30 goals. During this time he played in the European Cup and UEFA Cup.

In 1991 Grussmann moved to Spain to play for Real Betis, where he joined compatriot players Michal Bílek and Roman Kukleta. He scored eight goals in 38 league appearances for the Spanish side. Grussmann later returned to his homeland, playing briefly for his former clubs Baník Ostrava and Vítkovice as well as Sigma Olomouc in the final season of the Czechoslovak First League. Following the establishment of the Czech First League, Grussmann played there for five seasons, all for Opava, with his best goal return occurring in the 1996–97 season when he scored 13 times. Grussmann finished his career with 304 appearances and 68 goals from top-league Czechoslovak and Czech football. He later played in the second league for Třinec.

International career
Having played for his nation's junior national teams, Grussmann made his debut for the full national side in April 1988 in a friendly match against USSR. He scored his only senior international goal in a 2–0 friendly win against Australia in February 1991. Grussmann took part in three UEFA Euro 1992 qualifying matches in 1991, after which he did not represent his country again.

Management career
Grussmann led Jakubčovice until November 2006. He was named as Vítkovice's manager in December 2006. He remained at the club until August 2008, when he left his position following four successive losses at the beginning of the 2008–09 season.

References

External links

1964 births
Living people
Sportspeople from Opava
Czech footballers
Czechoslovak footballers
Czechoslovakia international footballers
Czech football managers
Czech First League players
FC Baník Ostrava players
MFK Vítkovice players
SK Sigma Olomouc players
SFC Opava players
FK Fotbal Třinec players
Czechoslovak expatriate footballers
Expatriate footballers in Spain
Segunda División players
Real Betis players
Association football forwards